Peter David Tarsey (5 August 1937 – 29 March 2015) was a British diver who competed for Great Britain at the 1956 Summer Olympics, and won a bronze medal at the 1958 Commonwealth Games.

Early life
Tarsey was born on 5 August 1937 in Brentford, Greater London, England.

Career
At the 1956 Summer Olympics in Melbourne, Australia, Tarsey competed in the Men's 3 metre springboard, where he finished 16th, and the Men's 10 metre platform, where he finished 14th.

Tarsey competed in two Commonwealth Games winning a bronze medal at Cardiff in 1958, in the Men's 3m Springboard event.

Personal life
Tarsey married Jean Biggs in February 1960. They had two sons, Alexei and Sascha. They lived in Spain for 18 years.

At the time of their deaths the Tarseys were trying to sell their house in order to move near their son Sascha and grandchildren in Majorca.

Murder
The couple were found shot dead "in each other's arms" at their villa in Xalo, near Benidorm, Spain, on 29 March 2015, by friends who had come to Sunday dinner. They had been killed three days earlier.

In July 2016 Driss Drizi, 63, a Moroccan immigrant painter, was jailed for 31 years after confessing to the double murder and striking a plea bargain with prosecutors. Drizi was sentenced to 15 years for each murder, an additional year for illegal possession of a weapon, and ordered to pay 150,000 euros to each of the Tarsey's two sons. Drizi shot the couple following an unspecified row with David Tarsey.

References

1937 births
2015 deaths
2015 murders in Spain
English male divers
Commonwealth Games bronze medallists for England
Divers at the 1956 Summer Olympics
Divers at the 1958 British Empire and Commonwealth Games
Deaths by firearm in Spain
Olympic divers of Great Britain
People from Brentford
People murdered in Spain
English people murdered abroad
Sportspeople from London
Male murder victims
Commonwealth Games medallists in diving
Medallists at the 1958 British Empire and Commonwealth Games